Praise Oghenefejiro Idamadudu (born 18 December 1998) is a Nigeria female track and field sprinter who competes in the 200 metres and the 400 metres. She was a silver medallist in the 4 × 400 metres relay at the 2018 Commonwealth Games.

Career
Born in Ovu, Delta State, she made her international debut at the 2014 African Youth Games, where she was the 200 m gold medallist. Later that year she competed at the 2014 World Junior Championships in Athletics in the 200, 400 and 4 × 400 metres relay. She was also due to compete for Nigeria at the 2014 Summer Youth Olympics, but the whole team was pressured into withdrawal over concerns about the West African Ebola virus epidemic. At the 2015 African Junior Athletics Championships she was a double gold medallist (200 m and 4 × 400 m relay) but was beaten into second in the 200 m at the 2015 African Youth Athletics Championships by South Africa's Nicola de Bruyn. She ended the year with three gold medals at the Commonwealth Youth Games, taking the 200 m and two relay titles.

Idamadudu took her first senior national title in the 200 m at the 2015 Nigerian Athletics Championships. Her performances that year earned her comparisons to Olympic medallist Falilat Ogunkoya from national media. She missed parts of the 2016 season due to a knee injury. She also competed sparingly in 2017, which her season highlight being a runner-up finish in the 200 m at the national championships. Idamadudu made her senior international debut at the 2018 Commonwealth Games, reaching the 200 m semi-finals and sharing in the 4 × 400 metres relay silver medals with Yinka Ajayi, Patience Okon George and Glory Onome Nathaniel.

International competitions

National titles
Nigerian Athletics Championships
200 m: 2015

References

External links

1998 births
Living people
Sportspeople from Delta State
Nigerian female sprinters
Commonwealth Games silver medallists for Nigeria
Commonwealth Games medallists in athletics
Athletes (track and field) at the 2018 Commonwealth Games
21st-century Nigerian women
Medallists at the 2018 Commonwealth Games